2MM is a narrowcast radio station based in the Sydney suburb of Dulwich Hill. 2MM broadcasts a Greek language service to Sydney and Wollongong.

See also

 List of radio stations in Australia

References

External links

Greek-Australian culture in Sydney
Greek-language radio stations
2MM
Radio stations in Sydney
Ethnic radio stations in Australia